BKF may refer to:
 Bar Keepers Friend, a cleaning product
 the BKF file format, used in the NTBackup command
 Budapest College of Communication and Business (BKF), a higher education institute in Hungary
 Burkina Faso, UNDP code
 Butterfly chair